Indian auxiliaries were those indigenous peoples of the Americas who allied with Spain and fought alongside the conquistadors during the Spanish colonization of the Americas. These auxiliaries acted as guides, translators and porters, and in these roles were also referred to as yanakuna, particularly during the Spanish conquest of the Inca Empire. The term was also used for formations composed of indigenous warriors which were used by the Spanish for reconnaissance and combat duties. Indian auxiliaries continued to be used by the Spanish to maintain control over their colonies in the Americas; frequently stationed on the frontier, they were often used to suppress anti-colonial revolts such as Arauco War.

History 
The formations of auxiliary Indians arose commonly from alliances established by the Spaniards, exploiting ethnic and tribal antagonisms that they found during their occupation of the territory they were attempting to conquer.  Hernán Cortés was one of the first captains who was known to strengthen his columns with these natives. Commonly after the conquest these auxiliary Indians were divided among the settlers of the territories already conquered. They often constituted the most numerous group of the conquerors' followers:

Fall of Tenochtitlan

During Hernán Cortés' campaign against the Aztecs from 1519 to 1521, he supplemented his meagre force of Spanish soldiers (numbering some 1,300) with hundreds of thousands of native auxiliaries, from various states such as Tlaxcala. During the final siege of the Aztec capital city of Tenochtitlan, Cortés, according to the account of one of his soldiers, Bernal Díaz del Castillo, had some 200,000 Tlaxcallan and other native auxiliaries, while the Aztec warriors drawn from the numerous cities surrounding Lake Xochimilco in the Valley of Mexico numbered more than 300,000.

Guatemala

The expedition of Pedro de Alvarado to Guatemala was composed of 480 Spaniards and thousands of auxiliary Indians from Tlaxcala, Cholula and other cities in central Mexico. In Guatemala the Spanish routinely fielded indigenous allies; at first these were Nahua brought from the recently conquered Mexico, later they also included Maya. It is estimated that for every Spaniard on the field of battle, there were at least 10 native auxiliaries. Sometimes there were as many as 30 indigenous warriors for every Spaniard, and it was the participation of these Mesoamerican allies that was particularly decisive. Some newly conquered Maya groups remained loyal to the Spanish once they had submitted to the conquest, such as the Tz'utujil and the K'iche' of Quetzaltenango, and provided them with warriors to assist further conquest.

In 1524, fresh from his victory over the Tz'utujil, Pedro de Alvarado led his army against the non-Maya Xinca of the Guatemalan Pacific lowlands. At this point Alvarado's force consisted of 250 Spanish infantry accompanied by 6,000 indigenous allies, mostly Kaqchikel and Cholutec.

The Mam fortress of Zaculeu was attacked by Gonzalo de Alvarado y Contreras, brother of Pedro de Alvarado, in 1525, with 40 Spanish cavalry and 80 Spanish infantry, and some 2,000 Mexican and K'iche' allies. When the Spanish besieged the Ixil city of Nebaj in 1530, their indigenous allies managed to scale the walls, penetrate the stronghold and set it on fire. Many defending Ixil warriors withdrew to fight the fire, which allowed the Spanish to storm the entrance and break the defences.

Peru and Chile

 During the siege of Cuzco, Francisco Pizarro had 200 Spaniards and 30,000 native Chankas, Huancas, Cañaris and Chachapoyas. 
 The column of Diego de Almagro, who went into Chile, had 500 Spaniards, 100 African slaves and about 10,000 auxiliary Indians. 
 In the case of the conquest of Chile by Pedro de Valdivia, the original group who left Cuzco included 11 Spaniards and 1,000 auxiliary Indians.

Colonial Period after the Conquest
After the initial conquest, most of these allies were considered less necessary and, sometimes, a liability. At times they were needed for defense of the extended Spanish Empire. They were incorporated into the military forces of the Empire, forming their own units, organised along European models under their own names, such as Compañías de Indios Nobles ("Companies of Noble Indians"). The necessity of defence came from either European threats like the Caribbean buccaneers and pirates or American threats such as the Chichimeca, Apache or Comanche tribes or the protracted Arauco war. These units fought in the independence wars.

See also
 United States Army Indian Scouts
 Inca army
 Aztec warfare
 Indios reyunos

Notes

References

Further reading

Indigenous military personnel of the Americas
Spanish conquests in the Americas
Conquistadors
History of indigenous peoples of the Americas
Military history of the Caribbean
Military history of Central America
Military history of South America
Military history of Latin America
Mesoamerican warfare